The 2013 Georgetown Hoyas football team represented Georgetown University in the 2013 NCAA Division I FCS football season. They were led by eighth-year head coach Kevin Kelly and played their home games at Multi-Sport Field. They were a member of the Patriot League. They finished the season 2–9, 1–4 in Patriot League play to finish in a tie for fifth place. At the end of the season, Kelly resigned to become the defensive coordinator at Ball State.

Schedule

References

Georgetown
Georgetown Hoyas football seasons
Georgetown Hoyas football